Mohammad Waliullah Khan Khaishgi is a retired Pakistani diplomat.

Early life 
Khaishgi was born in Khurja, Uttar Pradesh, India, on 5 July 1957.

Foreign service  
Khaishgi joined the Foreign Service of Pakistan and served in many senior positions. He has been the Ambassador of Pakistan to Egypt, Senegal, Sri Lanka and Saudi Arabia. He also held the position of the Additional Foreign Secretary.

References 

Living people
1957 births
Ambassadors of Pakistan to Saudi Arabia
Ambassadors of Pakistan to Egypt
High Commissioners of Pakistan to Sri Lanka
Foreign Secretaries of Pakistan